Robert Guérin (28 June 1876 – 19 March 1952) (née Clément Auguste Maurice Robert) was a French journalist, and the 1st President and one of the founders of the Fédération Internationale de Football Association (FIFA).  A journalist with Le Matin newspaper, Guérin was actively involved in football through his role as secretary of the Football Department of the Union des Sociétés Françaises de Sports Athlétiques.  He brought together representatives of the first seven member countries in Paris for the signing of FIFA's foundation act and agreement of the first FIFA statutes.  On 23 May 1904, Guérin (then just 28) was elected president at the inaugural FIFA Congress and remained in his post for two years, during which time another eight associations came on board, including the Football Association.

References

1876 births
1952 deaths
Founders of association football institutions
Presidents of FIFA